Heart of Mine may refer to:
"Heart of Mine" (The Oak Ridge Boys song)
 "Heart of Mine" (Peter Salett song)
 Heart of Mine, a 2000 album by Peter Salett
 "Heart of Mine" (Bob Dylan song)
 "Heart of Mine", a song by Boz Scaggs from Other Roads
 "Heart of Mine," a song by The Young Veins from Take a Vacation!